Damrosch (foaled in 1913) was an American Thoroughbred racehorse best known for winning the 1916 Preakness Stakes.

Background
Bred by August Belmont, Jr. at his Nursery Stud near Lexington, Kentucky, he was sired by the 1903 English Triple Crown winner, Rock Sand. Damrosch was out of the mare Dissembler, a daughter of the four-time Leading sire in North America, Hanover.

Racing career
Captain W. Fred Presgrave of Kentucky, who had trained the winner of the 1904 Preakness Stakes winner, Bryn Mawr, purchased Damrosch from August Belmont, Jr. on behalf of Canadian businessman J. K. L. Ross. Presgrave trained the colt part way into his three-year-old campaign when Albert Weston took over his conditioning. In the Preakness Stakes, the colt was ridden to victory by Linus McAtee and led from the start to win from Greenwood.

Stud record
Damrosch raced through age seven and was then retired to stud. He was not successful as a sire.

Pedigree

References

1913 racehorse births
Racehorses bred in Kentucky
Racehorses trained in the United States
Preakness Stakes winners
Belmont family
Thoroughbred family 12-b